Liu Jianxun (1913 – April 23, 1983) was a People's Republic of China politician. He was twice Communist Party of China Committee Secretary of Henan (1961–1966, 1971–1978), governor of Henan (1968–1978) and CPC Committee Secretary of Guangxi (1957–1961). Born in Hebei. He was a delegate to the 5th National People's Congress.

1913 births
1983 deaths
People's Republic of China politicians from Hebei
Chinese Communist Party politicians from Hebei
Political office-holders in Guangxi
CCP committee secretaries of Henan
Governors of Henan
Delegates to the 1st National People's Congress
Delegates to the 4th National People's Congress
Delegates to the 5th National People's Congress
CPPCC Chairmen of Henan
Members of the 8th Central Committee of the Chinese Communist Party
Members of the 9th Central Committee of the Chinese Communist Party
Members of the 10th Central Committee of the Chinese Communist Party
Members of the 11th Central Committee of the Chinese Communist Party